Gog Magog Golf Course is an  biological Site of Special Scientific Interest on Gog Magog Golf Club south-east of Cambridge in Cambridgeshire.

The course is calcareous grassland which has a rich variety of flora. The main grasses are upright brome, red fescue and false oat-grass, and there are herbs such as the nationally rare moon carrot and the locally rare perennial flax.

The site is private land with no public access.

References

Sites of Special Scientific Interest in Cambridgeshire